Farm to Market Road 1730 (FM 1730) is a farm to market road located in the South Plains region of Texas. FM 1730 is known locally in Lubbock as Slide Road.

Route description
FM 1730 begins at an intersection with FM 1317 in rural Lynn County. The highway enters the small community of New Home before running in unincorporated Lynn County again. Just north of New Home, FM 1730 crosses into Lubbock County and serves the town of Slide a few miles north of here. the highway enters the city limits of Lubbock for a short time before ending at FM 1585.

History
FM 1730 was first designated on May 23, 1951 along Slide Road and Lubbock County Road 1900 between Slide and US 62 (34th Street). The highway was later extended further south to New Home on January 18, 1952, absorbing approximately 3 miles of FM 1317. On November 28, 1955, the northern terminus of the highway was shortened by a mile to Loop 289. On June 27, 1995, the mileage of FM 1730 between FM 1585 and Loop 289 was transferred to UR 1730, but this section became part of FM 1730 again on November 15, 2018. On December 10, 2020, the section from FM 1585 (proposed Loop 88) to Loop 289 was cancelled and given to the city of Lubbock.

Junction list

References

1730
Transportation in Lynn County, Texas
Transportation in Lubbock County, Texas
Transportation in Lubbock, Texas